Robert Kirk  (1905-1962) was a Scottish parasitologist and pathologist.

Life
He was born on 26 January 1905 in Glasgow the son of the Rev Robert Lee Kirk, a Church of Scotland minister, and his wife Primrose Adair Martin, daughter of John Martin, a brewer. He was educated at Greenock Academy then studied Zoology and Medicine at Glasgow University, winning the Gairdner Medal in medicine in 1930. He graduated MB ChB in Medicine and BSc in Zoology. His zoological studies were under Prof John Graham Kerr.

He served in several Glasgow hospitals and notably as Assistant Bacteriologist in the Glasgow Public Health Laboratories. After obtaining a further Diploma in Public Health (DPH) in 1933 he went to Africa to work in the Sudan Medical Service where he worked for twenty-two years, in both the Stack and Wellcome Research Laboratories rising to be Director of the former. Here he specialised in the study of kala-azar and yellow fever. He also undertook the taxonomy of sand-flies. The Royal Society of Tropical Medicine and Hygiene awarded him the Chalmers Medal for his work. He was awarded his doctorate (MD) in 1939 and won the Bellahouston Gold Medal.

In 1943 he was elected a Fellow of the Royal Society of Edinburgh. His proposers were Sir John Graham Kerr, Robert Staig, Edward Hindle and Charles Wynford Parsons.

In 1948 he was awarded an OBE and granted membership of the Royal College of Physicians of London. He was made a Fellow in 1954.

In 1951 he became Professor of Pathology at the Kitchener School of Medicine in Khartoum. In 1955 he left Africa and took the Sinclair Chair in Singapore and in 1960 moved again to be Professor of Pathology at the University of Hong Kong.

He died on 6 December 1962. He is buried in Hong Kong Cemetery.

Family
He married Elsie Tan Lee Chang, whom he met in Singapore. They had three sons and a daughter.

References

1905 births
1962 deaths
Scottish pathologists
Fellows of the Royal Society of Edinburgh
Scottish parasitologists
Scientists from Glasgow
People educated at Greenock Academy
Alumni of the University of Glasgow
20th-century Scottish medical doctors
Scottish people of the British Empire
Fellows of the Royal College of Physicians
Academic staff of the University of Hong Kong
Officers of the Order of the British Empire